Ma Jian (born 20 August 1969 in Shijiazhuang, Hebei) is a retired professional basketball player from China.

Basketball career
Ma Jian is known for playing college basketball in the United States and was among the first Chinese nationals to play competitive basketball in the United States. He was to play for the UCLA Bruins but he failed the entrance exam due to his lack of fluency in English. He would play junior college for Utah Valley Community College and later play college basketball for two years with the University of Utah.

Attempting to break into the NBA, Ma was able to play exhibition games with the Phoenix Suns and the Los Angeles Clippers in the team's summer-league programs in 1994. He was among the final cuts for the 1995–96 Clippers roster but he did not feature in any regular games for the Clippers. After being cut, Ma served as commentator for the Clippers games on Chinese radio station KAZN, a 24-hour Mandarin Chinese radio station covering the Los Angeles area. 

Ma also had a brief stint in the Philippines playing for the Hapee Cavity Fighters of the Philippine Basketball League (PBL). He helped Hapee clinch the 1996 PBL Reinforced Conference title – the first for the franchise.

He later returned to China to play for the Beijing Olympians of the Chinese Basketball Association (CBA), until he left during the 2000–2001 season.

He also competed in the 1990 Asian Games and the 1992 Summer Olympics for the Chinese men's national basketball team. His decision to pursue a career in the United States reportedly led to his exclusion to the Chinese national team.

Filmography

References

1969 births
Living people
Asian Games gold medalists for China
Asian Games medalists in basketball
Basketball players at the 1990 Asian Games
Basketball players at the 1992 Summer Olympics
Basketball players from Hebei
Beijing Olympians players
Chinese Basketball Association players
Chinese expatriate basketball people in the Philippines
Chinese expatriate basketball people in the United States
Chinese men's basketball players
1990 FIBA World Championship players
Olympic basketball players of China
Sportspeople from Shijiazhuang
Utah Utes men's basketball players
Male actors from Hebei
Chinese male film actors
21st-century Chinese male actors
Medalists at the 1990 Asian Games